Ivan Spychka (born 18 January 1991) is a Ukrainian professional footballer who plays as a defender for Slovak Fortuna Liga club MFK Tatran Liptovský Mikuláš. Previously, he played for fourth tier Polish club Concordia Elbląg.

Club career
Spychka is a product of the different Dnipropetrovsk youth sportive school systems. Then he transferred to FC Metalurh Zaporizhzhia youth sportive school and became a member of the main team. He made his debut in the Ukrainian Premier League in the match against FC Volyn Lutsk on 28 November 2010. In August 2013 he signed a contract with FC Dynamo-2 and left this club in June 2015.

References

External links

Prifile at allplayers.in.ua

1991 births
Living people
Ukrainian footballers
Footballers from Dnipro
Association football defenders
FC Metalurh Zaporizhzhia players
FC Metalurh-2 Zaporizhzhia players
FC Helios Kharkiv players
FC Arsenal-Kyivshchyna Bila Tserkva players
FC Dynamo-2 Kyiv players
FC Ararat Moscow players
FC Ararat Yerevan players
FC Shukura Kobuleti players
MFK Tatran Liptovský Mikuláš players
Ukrainian Premier League players
Ukrainian First League players
Armenian First League players
Erovnuli Liga players
III liga players
Ukrainian expatriate footballers
Expatriate footballers in Russia
Expatriate footballers in Armenia
Expatriate footballers in Georgia (country)
Expatriate footballers in Poland
Expatriate footballers in Slovakia
Ukrainian expatriate sportspeople in Russia
Ukrainian expatriate sportspeople in Armenia
Ukrainian expatriate sportspeople in Georgia (country)
Ukrainian expatriate sportspeople in Poland
Ukrainian expatriate sportspeople in Slovakia